Jam tomorrow (or the older spelling jam to-morrow) is an expression for a never-fulfilled promise, or for some pleasant event in the future, which is never likely to materialize. Originating from a bit of wordplay involving Lewis Carroll's Alice, it has been referenced in discussions of philosophy, economics, and politics.

Origin 
The expression originates from Lewis Carroll's 1871 book Through the Looking Glass and What Alice Found There. This is a pun on a mnemonic for the usage of the Latin word iam (formerly often written and pronounced jam), which means "at this time", but only in the future or past tense, not in the present (which is instead nunc "now"). In the book, the White Queen offers Alice "jam every other day" as an inducement to work for her:
"I'm sure I'll take you with pleasure!" the Queen said. "Two pence a week, and jam every other day."Alice couldn't help laughing, as she said, "I don't want you to hire me – and I don't care for jam.""It's very good jam," said the Queen."Well, I don't want any to-day, at any rate.""You couldn't have it if you did want it," the Queen said. "The rule is, jam to-morrow and jam yesterday – but never jam to-day.""It must come sometimes to 'jam to-day'," Alice objected."No, it can't," said the Queen. "It's jam every other day: to-day isn't any other day, you know.""I don't understand you," said Alice. "It's dreadfully confusing!"
The passage inspired the title of the 1979 musical But Never Jam Today.

Usage
In more recent times, the phrase has been used to describe a variety of unfulfilled political promises on issues such as tax, and was used by C. S. Lewis in satirizing the extrapolation of evolution from biological theory to philosophical guiding principle, in his 1957 poem "Evolutionary Hymn":

Monica Redlich's 1937 novel, for children and young adults, and older, uses the Carrollian phrase as its title, "Jam Tomorrow". In the novel, it is the family motto of the children of an impoverished vicar. This is not their only quotation from Lewis Carroll, but it reflects their stoic acceptance of straitened means today, and an unquenched hope for better things in some unforeseen tomorrow.

John Maynard Keynes also makes use of the image of "never jam today" in order to portray vividly the tendency to excessive saving which may lead to economic stagnation:

British folk musician Billy Bragg uses it in his 1986 song "The Home Front":

References

Lewis Carroll
1870s neologisms